The Rocks of Dovbush is a group of natural and man-made structures carved out of rock at around 980 m ASL approximately 3 km from the village Bubnyshche in the Ivano-Frankivsk Oblast (province) of western Ukraine. The name of the formations comes from a leader of the opryshky movement, Oleksa Dovbush.

The rocks are a part of the Polyanytskiy Regional Landscape Park.

Notes

See also
 List of colossal sculpture in situ
 

Mountain monuments and memorials
Monuments and memorials in Ukraine
Buildings and structures in Ivano-Frankivsk Oblast